The P&O Pioneer is an upcoming RoRo cross-channel hybrid ferry due to be delivered in early 2023. She is the first of her class ordered by P&O Ferries, with her due to be followed by the P&O Liberte.

Design
Unlike previous ferries operated on the channel, the Pioneer's design is a radical shift away from convention. Instead of having a distinct bow and stern like previous designs for the Channel, the Pioneer will utilise a double-ended hull design, with two bridges. While double-ended ferries are nothing new - some notable examples include BC Ferries' Coastal-class ferries and the Staten Island Ferries, the Pioneer will be the first double-ended ferry to be used on the Channel, alongside being the first double-ended ship of her size. According to P&O, using two bridges on both ends instead of one saves 10 minutes in either harbour as there is no need to turn the ship around when docking or departing. The Pioneer will also be the first ship on the Channel to utilise diesel-electric Azipod propulsion, with four Azipods mounted in corners around the hull of the vessel, capable of swivelling 360 degrees. The ship will also feature some 8.8MWh of batteries, allowing for a departure from Dover or Calais without diesel engines. These ships are designed to also be converted to battery-electric propulsion at a later date, when charging infrastructure is available on both sides of the Channel. On the port and starboard sides amidships, the ship will feature two sets of panoramic windows giving a view of both the French and British coastlines.

History
The ships were first announced in September 2019 in a P&O press release. In the press release, it was announced that P&O had ordered two ships of the class, with two further options for a total of four ships. However, it wasn't until January 2020 when the first renders of the ships were released, including some additional technical details. On October 15, 2020, the first steel was cut in the construction of the P&O Pioneer, then simply referred to by hull number, 19121007. Later, it was announced on 21 December 2020 that the keels for both the Pioneer and Liberte (then 19121008) were laid down. Construction continued throughout 2021 without any news until January 2022, when on the 2nd the Pioneer was launched, alongside name announcements and further technical disclosure. 

P&O Pioneer is scheduled to enter service in early 2023 followed by her sister vessel later that year.

References

Ferries of the United Kingdom
Ships of P&O Ferries
2022 ships